The Pace Jubilee Singers were a gospel group founded by Charles Henry Pace in Chicago in 1925, and one of the first gospel groups to be recorded. They recorded more than 40 songs for Victor and for Brunswick Records in 192629, including spirituals arranged by Pace, and songs and hymns by Pace and Charles Albert Tindley and others. They performed in close harmony style, usually accompanied by piano or organ. Thomas A. Dorsey was briefly associated with them. In their later recordings, Hattie Parker is identified as soloist.

Recordings 
 1926"My Lord What a Morning" / "I'm Going Through with Jesus" 10" 78rpm single Victor 20225 
 1926"My Lord's Writing All the Time" / "I Do, Don't You?" 10" 78rpm single Victor 20226 
 1926"Gonna Reap What You Sow" / "Everybody's Gotta Walk That Lonesome Valley" 10" 78rpm single Victor 20310 
 1927"We Will Walk thru the Valley of Peace" / "Is It Well with Your Soul Today?" 10" 78rpm single Brunswick 7001 
 1927"His Eye Is on the Sparrows" / "Walk in the Light of God" 10" 78rpm single Brunswick 7008 
 1927"Lawdy Won't You Come By Home" / "My Lord Will Deliver" 10" 78rpm single Brunswick 7009 
 1927"Shouting On" / "Oh Death" 10" 78rpm single Victor 20813 
 1927"I'll Journey On" / "All the Way" 10" 78rpm single Victor 20947 
 1927"Ride On Jesus" / "Heav'n" unreleased 
 1928"Stand by Me" / "Take Your Burden to the Lord and Leave It There" 10" 78rpm single Victor 21551 
 1928"Ezekiel Saw the Wheel" / "When the Saints Go Marching In" 10" 78rpm single Victor 21582 
 1928"What a Friend We Have In Jesus" / "Nothing Between" 10" 78rpm single Victor 21655 
 1928"Seek and You Shall Find" / "My Lord's Going to Move This Wicked Race" 10" 78rpm single Victor 21705 
 1928"Old Time Religion" 10" 78rpm single Victor 22097-B 
 1928"Every Time I Feel Spirit" / "I'm Going to Do All I Can" 10" 78rpm single Victor 38018 
 1929"A Little Talk with Jesus" / "Like Is Like a Mountain Railroad" 
 1929"I'm Going Through Jesus" / "What a Friend We have in Jesus" 10" single Victor 23363 (re-releases) 
 1929"I've Done My Work" / "My Task" 10" 78rpm single Victor 38501 
 1929"Steal Away and Pray" / "The Haven of Rest" 10" 78rpm single Victor 38511 
 1929"It Pays to Serve Jesus" / "It's a Precious Thing" 10" 78rpm single Victor 38522 
 1929"No Night There" / "In That City" 10" 78rpm single Victor 38543 
 1929"It Is Well with My Soul" / "Holy Ghost with Light Divine" 10" 78rpm single Victor 23412 
 1929"Holy Ghost with Light Divine" / "Cryin' Holy unto the Lord" 10" 78rpm single Victor 38573 
 1929"I Can't Stay Away" / "Walk with Me" 10" 78rpm single Victor 38591 
 1929"Roll Jordan Roll" / "Throw Out the Lifeline" 10" 78rpm single Victor 38622 
 1929"What Are They Doing in Heaven Today?" / "Jesus Is a Rock in the Weary land" 10" 78rpm single Victor 38631 
 1929"You Got to Run, Run, Run" / "Old Time Religion" 10" 78rpm single Bluebird B-5811

References 

American gospel musical groups
Brunswick Records artists
Victor Records artists
Musical groups established in 1925
Musical groups disestablished in 1929